The 1924 Duluth Kelleys season was their second in the league. The team improved on their previous output of 4–3, winning five games. They finished fourth in the league standings.

Schedule

 Games in italics are non-league games

Standings

References

Duluth Kelleys seasons
Duluth Kelleys
1924 in sports in Minnesota